Mabel McKay (1907–1993) was a member of the Long Valley Cache Creek Pomo Indians and was of Patwin descent. She was the last Dreamer of the Pomo people and was renowned for her basket weaving.

Life 
McKay was born on 12 January 1907 in Nice in Lake County, California. Her father was Yanta Boone (Potter Valley Pomo) and her mother was Daisy Hansen (Lolsel Cache Creek Pomo). She was raised by her maternal grandmother, Sarah Taylor, who taught her both the Long Valley Cache Creek language and how to identify and forage for medicinal plants. At the age of eight, she was guided by her dreams to weave her first basket. She did not attend school past the third grade due to a series of illnesses.

Basket-weaving 
Weaving for McKay was a spiritual path, not a craft. She claimed she was strictly instructed by Spirit as to how and what to weave. Because of the sacred nature of her weaving, she usually wove in private. She used sedge for her baskets, and redbud for the red designs, as per Pomo tradition. Some of her baskets also used feathers.
Her baskets were featured in many newspapers as a prodigy of her craft. She began giving demonstrations in the State Indian Museum in Sacramento, refusing to sell them and only giving them as gifts. In the late 1970s she began teaching basket-weaving classes for both native and non-native students. She continued with her baskets until death, and many have become prized exhibits in museums such as the National Museum of Natural History.

Academic and advisory work 
In the late 1960s McKay was on the Native American Advisory Council for a proposed dam in Dry Creek, which would disturb an ancestral Pomo village site and long-standing beds of sedge. Although they could not prevent the dam's construction, the council was able to document the site and transplant some of the sedge beds.
McKay was also a well-respected scholar who spoke at universities and served as a cultural consultant for anthropologists. She spoke at the New School in New York with Essie Parrish on March 14, 1972. In 1976 she was appointed to California’s first Native American Heritage Commission.

Medicine 
McKay also became a well respected healer among those in her community. She was one of the last Pomo dream doctors, and would often travel great distances to tend to her patients.

Personal life 
Prior to the end of World War ll, Mabel married Charlie McKay, with whom she had a son, Marshall (1952-2021). After Charlie died in the 1960s, McKay worked at an apple cannery.

Death 
McKay died on May 31, 1993, and was buried next to Essie Parish in the Kashaya Pomo cemetery.

Exhibits 
From 2016 to 2017 the Autry Museum of the American West exhibited McKay's work in an exhibit titled "The Life and Work of Mabel McKay". Her son, Marshall McKay, helped put together the exhibit.

Legacy 
Greg Sarris published a biography of Mabel in 1997, called Weaving the Dream (University of California Press). 

McKay's work has inspired other artists, including Dineh artist Leatrice Mikkelsen.

See also
 Native American basket weavers
 Visual arts by indigenous peoples of the Americas

References

Further reading
 Ludwig, David. 1994. Pomo Basketweavers: A Tribute To Three Elders. Creative Light Production. Video.
 
 Matuz, R. (1998). St. James guide to native North American artists. Detroit: St. James Press. pp. 369–370. .
 Sarris, Greg. 1993. Keeping slug woman alive: A holistic approach to American Indian texts.  Berkeley: University of California Press. .

1907 births
1993 deaths
Native American basket weavers
Pomo people
Patwin
Religious figures of the indigenous peoples of North America
People from Lake County, California
Artists from California
20th-century American women artists
Native American women artists
Women basketweavers
20th-century Native Americans
20th-century Native American women